Girls on Film (named after Duran Duran's song, also covered by the group) is the first music DVD by Girls Aloud and was released in 2005. The video contained all of their music videos at the time of release. It contained some of their most memorable television performances, and footage from their MTV special Girls Aloud - The Show that aired on MTV Hits on 30 October 2004. There is also behind-the-scenes footage, a Q&A fan session, a double-sided poster and a Christmas television advertisement starring the girls.

Track listing

Chart

External links
 Official site
 IMDB entry

Girls Aloud video albums